Ictinogomphus australis, known as the Australian tiger, is a species of dragonfly in the family Lindeniidae, 
which was formerly part of the family Gomphidae. It is found near rivers, lagoons, lakes and ponds. They are large dragonflies (wingspan 100mm, length 70mm) with eyes widely spaced on top of the head. They have clear wings and are yellow and black in colour. The males are identified from females by two curved flaps below segment eight of the abdomen. They are found in an arc ranging from about Broome, Western Australia along the north of the continent to Point Hicks on the south-east corner. The taxon has been assessed for the IUCN Red List as being of least concern.

Gallery

References

Lindeniidae
Odonata of Australia
Insects of Australia
Endemic fauna of Australia
Taxa named by Edmond de Sélys Longchamps
Insects described in 1873